Mizhuyeva is a rural locality (a village) in Yorgvinskoye Rural Settlement, Kudymkarsky District, Perm Krai, Russia. The population was 256 as of 2010. There are 12 streets.

Geography 
Mizhuyeva is located 20 km north of Kudymkar (the district's administrative centre) by road. Yermakova is the nearest rural locality.

References 

Rural localities in Kudymkarsky District